Juan de Valladolid (English: John of Valladoid) (1420–?), also known as Juan Poeta ("John the poet"), was a Castilian poet. Born Jewish, he converted to Christianity later in life. As a converso or a baptized Jew, he married a Christian woman named Jamila.  Some say he later married a Moorish woman in Fez.

With his conversion being widely known, contemporary poets refer to him invariably as "Juan el Judio" ("John the Jew") and he was held in high regard by Queen Isabella of Spain. His poems are scattered throughout various collections, including the Cancionero de Antón de Montoro.

1420 births
Spanish poets
Conversos
15th-century Castilian Jews
Converts to Roman Catholicism from Judaism
Spanish Roman Catholics
Year of death unknown